The following is a list of notable deaths in May 2021.

Entries for each day are listed alphabetically by surname. A typical entry lists information in the following sequence:
 Name, age, country of citizenship at birth, subsequent country of citizenship (if applicable), reason for notability, cause of death (if known), and reference.

May 2021

1
Felicia Adeyoyin, 82, Nigerian educationist and princess.
Mary V. Ahern, 98, American radio and television producer.
Gary K. Aronhalt, 72, American lawyer, Virginia secretary of public safety (1998–2002).
Pieter Aspe, 68, Belgian writer.
Debu Chaudhuri, 85, Indian sitarist and writer, complications from COVID-19.
Geraldo Dantas de Andrade, 89, Brazilian Roman Catholic prelate, auxiliary bishop of São Luís do Maranhão (1998–2010).
Francis Ducreux, 76, French racing cyclist.
Marc Dudicourt, 88, French actor (A Matter of Resistance, King of Hearts, Jupiter's Thigh).
Olympia Dukakis, 89, American actress (Moonstruck, Steel Magnolias, Tales of the City), Oscar winner (1988).
Henryetta Edwards, 95, British actress (Squibs, She Shall Have Murder, The Feminine Touch).
José Daniel Falla Robles, 64, Colombian Roman Catholic prelate, auxiliary bishop of Cali (2009–2016) and bishop of Soacha (since 2016), COVID-19.
Jean Fontaine, 84, French theologian and writer, COVID-19.
Helen Murray Free, 98, American chemist, complications from a stroke.
Richard Halliwell, 62, British game designer (Warhammer, Space Hulk, Block Mania).
József Hámori, 89, Hungarian biologist and politician, minister of culture (1998–1999).
Joseph W. Hatchett, 88, American jurist, judge of the U.S. Court of Appeals for the Fifth Circuit (1979–1981), judge (1981–1999) and chief judge (1996–1999) of the Eleventh Circuit.
Peter Heerey, 82, Australian jurist, judge of the Federal Court of Australia (1990–2009), cancer.
Włodzimierz Heliński, 65, Polish speedway rider.
Tom Hickey, 77, Irish actor (Gothic, High Spirits, My Left Foot).
Wondress Hutchinson, 56, American singer ("Got to Have Your Love").
Paul Ioannidis, 97, Greek resistance fighter and pilot.
Al Jamison, 83, American football player (Houston Oilers).
Kate Jennings, 72, Australian poet and writer (Moral Hazard).
Bikramjeet Kanwarpal, 52, Indian actor (Shortcut Romeo, Ghazi, Madha), COVID-19.
Ghulam Mohammed Khan, 74, Indian equestrian, COVID-19.
Kuan Yun-loong, 92, Taiwanese painter, writer and poet, complications from a fall.
John Paul Leon, 49, American comic book artist (Static, Earth X, The Winter Men), cancer.
Edy Lima, 96, Brazilian writer, Prêmio Jabuti laureate (1975).
Nancy McCredie, 76, Canadian Olympic athlete (1964).
Nine Moati, 83, French novelist.
Joseph Z. Nederlander, 93, American theatre owner and manager.
Barry Nelson, 89, Australian rugby league footballer (Canterbury-Bankstown Bulldogs, Newtown Jets).
Andrzej Osęka, 89, Polish art historian, journalist and art critic, recipient of the Order of Polonia Restituta.
Ricardo Alberto Ramírez, 48, Argentine footballer, complications from COVID-19.
Mikhail Plotkin, 77, Russian music producer and administrator (Vesyolye Rebyata, Samotsvety, Leysya, Pesnya), complications from COVID-19.
Rafael Roncagliolo, 76, Peruvian diplomat and politician, minister of foreign affairs (2011–2013).
Kishan Rungta, 88, Indian cricket player (Maharashtra, Rajasthan) and administrator, COVID-19.
Mohammad Shahabuddin, 53, Indian politician and convicted kidnapper, Bihar MLA (1990–1996) and MP (1996–2009), COVID-19.
W. Royal Stokes, 90, American writer.
Henry Ventura, 55, Venezuelan politician, deputy (since 2020) and minister of health (2015), COVID-19.
Ernest E. West, 89, American soldier, Medal of Honor recipient.
Stuart Woolf, 85, English-Italian historian.

2
Bob Abernethy, 93, American journalist (NBC News) and television presenter (Religion & Ethics Newsweekly).
Alcira Argumedo, 80, Argentine sociologist and politician, deputy (2009–2017), lung cancer.
John Bridgwater, 83, British chemical engineer.
Joel Chadabe, 82, American electronic music pioneer.
Bronisław Cieślak, 77, Polish actor (07 zgłoś się, Pierwsza miłość), television presenter and politician, deputy (1997–2005).
Gwendalyn F. Cody, 99, American politician, member of the Virginia House of Delegates (1983–1986).
Frank Costa, 83, Australian entrepreneur and philanthropist, president of Geelong Football Club (1998–2010), cancer.
Jacques d'Amboise, 86, American ballet dancer, choreographer and actor (Seven Brides for Seven Brothers, Carousel, Off Beat), stroke.
Lolly Debattista, 91, Maltese footballer (Floriana, Ħamrun Spartans, Valletta).
David Humphreys, 84, Australian Olympic cyclist (1964).
Abdur Rauf Khan, 82, Bangladeshi politician, MP (1988–1990).
Hans Lotz, 73, German-Australian hammer thrower.
Eric McClure, 42, American racing driver (NASCAR Xfinity Series).
Sally Falk Moore, 97, American legal anthropologist.
Andrzej Możejko, 72, Polish footballer (Widzew Łódź).
S. G. Neginhal, 92, Indian forester and conservationist, COVID-19.
Janneke Raaijmakers, 47, Dutch historian, cancer.
Teresa Román Vélez, 95, Colombian writer and chef.
Carlos Romero Barceló, 88, Puerto Rican politician, mayor of San Juan (1969–1977) and governor (1977–1985), sepsis complicated by a urinary tract infection.
Damodar Barku Shingada, 66, Indian politician, MP (1980–1996, 2004–2009), COVID-19.
Pat Semple, 81, Scottish landscape artist.
Marcel Stellman, 96, Belgian record producer and lyricist, creator of Countdown.
Jesús Hilario Tundidor, 85, Spanish poet.
Bobby Unser, 87, American Hall of Fame racing driver, three-time Indianapolis 500 winner.
Paul Vollmar, 86, German-born Swiss Roman Catholic prelate, auxiliary bishop of Chur (1993–2009).
Tommy West, 78, American music producer (Life and Times, I Got a Name) and singer-songwriter, complications from Parkinson's disease.
Blaha Ben Ziane, 67–68, Algerian actor (Nass Mlah City, Djemai Family, Sultan Achour 10), complications from surgery.

3
Alfons Adam, 76, Austrian lawyer and politician, founder of Christian Party of Austria.
Rafael Albrecht, 79, Argentine footballer (San Lorenzo, Club León, national team), COVID-19.
Noor Alam Khalil Amini, 68, Indian Islamic scholar.
Vinod Kumar Bansal, 71, Indian educationist, heart attack.
Aurélien Boisvert, 93, Canadian historian.
Marion M. Bradford, 74, American scientist (Bradford protein assay).
Hal Breeden, 76, American baseball player (Montreal Expos, Hanshin Tigers, Chicago Cubs).
Donald Cameron, 74, Canadian politician, premier of Nova Scotia (1991–1993) and Nova Scotia MLA (1974–1993).
María Colombo de Acevedo, 64, Argentine politician, senator (2001–2009), COVID-19.
Seán Corcoran, 74, Irish singer.
Mary Cullinan, 70, American academic administrator, president of Eastern Washington University.
Vinson Filyaw, 51, American convicted child rapist.
Tatjana Gamerith, 102, German-Austrian painter and graphic artist.
András Gergely, 74, Hungarian historian and diplomat, ambassador to the Netherlands.
Sabbam Hari, 68, Indian politician, MP (2009–2014), COVID-19.
Brian S. Hartley, 95, British biochemist.
Surat Ikramov, 76, Uzbekistani human rights activist, pneumonia, diabetes and prostate cancer.
Jagmohan, 93, Indian civil servant and politician, governor of Jammu and Kashmir (1984–1990), MP (1996–2004) and lieutenant governor of Delhi (1980–1981, 1982–1984).
Alan Keely, 38, Irish footballer (Shelbourne).
Michèle Léridon, 62, French journalist and news director (Agence France-Presse, Conseil supérieur de l'audiovisuel member).
Iñaki Mallona Txertudi, 88, Spanish-born Puerto Rican Roman Catholic prelate, bishop of Arecibo (1991–2010).
Steve McKean, 77, American-born New Zealand basketball coach (national team), cancer.
Else Michelet, 79, Norwegian journalist and satirist.
Frazier Glenn Miller Jr., 80, American domestic terrorist, perpetrator of the Overland Park Jewish Community Center shooting.
Phil Naro, 63, American rock vocalist and theme songwriter (6teen), tongue cancer.
Volodymyr Nechayev, 70, Ukrainian football player (Chornomorets Odesa, Kolos Nikopol) and manager (Olkom Melitopol).
R. Balakrishna Pillai, 86, Indian politician and actor (Vedikkettu, Ival Oru Naadody), Kerala MLA (1960–1965, 1977–2006).
Lloyd Price, 88, American Hall of Fame R&B singer ("Personality", "Lawdy Miss Clawdy", "Stagger Lee"), complications from diabetes.
Boddu Ramarao, 72, Indian politician, COVID-19.
Hamid Rashid Ma`ala, Iraqi politician, MP (2005–2010), COVID-19.
Cliff Slaughter, 92, British political activist.
Dick Steere, 94, American football player (Philadelphia Eagles, Edmonton Eskimos).
Masatomo Taniguchi, 75, Japanese Olympic basketball player (1972), pancreatic cancer.
Kamel Tchalabi, 74, Algerian footballer (USM Alger, national team).
Burhanettin Uysal, 53, Turkish academic and politician, MP (2015–2018), COVID-19.
Franz Vansteenkiste, 86, Belgian politician, MP (1981–1987).
Ed Ward, 72, American music writer and radio commentator.
Béchir Ben Yahmed, 93, Tunisian-French journalist, founder of Jeune Afrique, complications from COVID-19.

4
Simon Achidi Achu, 86, Cameroonian politician, prime minister (1992–1996) and senator (since 2013).
Antony Anandarayar, 75, Indian Roman Catholic prelate, bishop of Ootacamund (1997–2004) and archbishop of Pondicherry and Cuddalore (2004–2021), COVID-19.
Julie Chipchase, 60, British football player and manager (Leeds United Ladies, Doncaster Rovers).
Steve Conroy, 64, English footballer (Sheffield United, Rotherham United, Rochdale).
Aloísio Hilário de Pinho, 87, Brazilian Roman Catholic prelate, bishop of Jataí (2000–2009) and Tocantinópolis (1981–1999), heart attack.
Margaret Forsyth, 59, New Zealand netball player (national team), coach (Magic), and politician, Hamilton city councillor (2010–2016, since 2019), cancer.
Omar Hugo Gómez, 65, Argentine footballer (Quilmes Atlético Club), COVID-19.
Subhadra Sen Gupta, 68, Indian writer, COVID-19.
Paulo Gustavo, 42, Brazilian actor (Minha Mãe é uma Peça, Vai Que Cola, Fala Sério, Mãe!) and comedian, complications from COVID-19.
Jim Hagan, 83, American basketball player (Tennessee Tech Golden Eagles, Phillips 66ers).
Jan Hahn, 47, German television presenter and radio host (Wheel of Fortune).
Chuck Hicks, 93, American stuntman (Dick Tracy, Star Trek II: The Wrath of Khan, Runaway Train), complications from a stroke.
Peter Toshio Jinushi, 90, Japanese Roman Catholic prelate, bishop of Sapporo (1987–2009).
Jim Johnson, 78, Canadian ice hockey player (Philadelphia Flyers, Los Angeles Kings, Minnesota Fighting Saints).
V. Kalyanam, 98, Indian freedom fighter.
Nick Kamen, 59, English model, singer ("Each Time You Break My Heart") and songwriter ("I Promised Myself"), bone marrow cancer.
Yosef Kleinman, 91, Slovakian Holocaust survivor.
Genji Kuniyoshi, 90, Japanese singer, prostate cancer.
Ricky Lo, 75, Filipino journalist (The Philippine Star) and television host (CelebriTV), stroke.
Sir Leslie Marr, 2nd Baronet, 98, British racing driver and landscape artist.
Alan McLoughlin, 54, Irish footballer (Portsmouth, Swindon Town, national team), cancer.
Ray Miller, 76, American baseball coach and manager (Minnesota Twins, Baltimore Orioles).
Luciano Modica, 71, Italian politician, senator (2002–2006), heart attack.
Harvey Frans Nelson Jr., 97, American diplomat, ambassador to Swaziland (1985–1988).
Abhilasha Patil, 47, Indian actress (Chhichhore), COVID-19.
Karamat Rahman Niazi, Pakistani naval officer, chief of naval staff (1979–1983).
Traffic Ramaswamy, 87, Indian social activist, cardiac arrest.
Willian Santiago, 30, Brazilian illustrator, graphic designer and educator, COVID-19.
Julião Sarmento, 72, Portuguese multimedia artist and painter.
Aleksandr Saprykin, 74, Russian volleyball player, Olympic bronze medalist (1972).
Raúl Horacio Scarrone Carrero, 90, Uruguayan Roman Catholic prelate, auxiliary bishop of Montevideo (1982–1987) and bishop of Florida (1987–2008).
T. S. Shanbhag, 84, Indian bookseller, COVID-19.
Kirsten Stallknecht, 83, Danish nurse and trade unionist, president of FTF (1977–1984) and ICN (1997–2001).
Manas Bihari Verma, 77, Indian aeronautical scientist.
William Warner Westenra, 7th Baron Rossmore, 90, Irish noble.
Bernard Ziegler, 88, French pilot and engineer (Airbus).

5
Jonathan Bush, 89, American banker.
Cheng Youshu, 97, Chinese diplomat and poet.
Paul Chomat, 83, French politician, deputy (1981–1988).
Del Crandall, 91, American baseball player (Boston/Milwaukee Braves) and manager (Milwaukee Brewers).
Konstantinas Dobrovolskis, 81, Lithuanian radiologist, minister of health (2001–2003).
Lucinda Franks, 74, American journalist (The New Yorker, The New York Times, The Atlantic), Pulitzer Prize winner (1971), cancer.
Yuriy Gavrilov, 54, Ukrainian handball player, Olympic gold medalist (1992).
Fikrat Goja, 85, Azerbaijani poet.
Abelardo González, 76, Spanish footballer (UP Langreo, Sporting de Gijón, Valencia CF).
Emine Işınsu, 82, Turkish writer, poet, and journalist.
Bertil Johansson, 86, Swedish footballer (IFK Göteborg, national team).
George Jung, 78, American drug trafficker and smuggler, subject of Blow.
René Le Corre, 98, French poet.
Li Man-king, 99, Hong Kong broadcaster (Rediffusion Radio, Radio Vilaverde Lda, CRHK).
Urbano Marín, 85, Chilean judge, president of the Supreme Court (2008–2010).
Doug Melvin, 92, British rower.
Nuno P. Monteiro, 50, Portuguese-American political scientist.
T. K. S. Natarajan, 87, Indian actor (Then Kinnam, Needhikku Thalaivanangu, Mangala Vaathiyam).
Edward Pietrzyk, 71, Polish military officer and diplomat.
Georgy Prokopenko, 84, Ukrainian swimmer, Olympic silver medallist (1964).
Valeriy Raenko, 65, Russian politician, member (since 2007) and chairman (since 2011) of the Legislative Assembly of Kamchatka Krai.
Barry Reilly, 73, Australian rugby league player (Sydney Roosters, Cronulla-Sutherland Sharks), kidney failure.
Hermann Schmitz, 92, German philosopher and professor (University of Kiel).
Gerry Schoen, 74, American baseball player (Washington Senators).
Ashraf Sehrai, 77, Indian Kashmiri separatist, chairman of All Parties Hurriyat Conference (since 2018), COVID-19.
Dildar Hossain Selim, 70, Bangladeshi politician, MP (2001–2006).
Frank Sheehan, 83, Australian politician, Victorian MLA (1982–1992).
Thangjam Nandakishor Singh, 64, Indian politician, Manipur MLA (2007–2012), COVID-19.
Feđa Stojanović, 73, Serbian actor (T.T. Syndrome, The Fourth Man, Ljubav i drugi zločini).
David F. Swensen, 67, American investor and philanthropist, cancer.
Dan Tawfik, 65, Israeli biochemist (Weizmann Institute of Science), EMET Prize winner (2020), climbing accident.
Ray Teret, 79, English disc jockey and convicted rapist.
K. V. Thikkurissi, 88, Indian writer and poet, COVID-19.
Philipose Mar Chrysostom Mar Thoma, 103, Indian Mar Thoma Syrian prelate, metropolitan of the Church (1999–2007).
Vivek Yadav, 36, Indian cricketer (Rajasthan), complications from stomach cancer and COVID-19.
Alfredo Zanellato, 90, Italian painter and sculptor.

6
G. Anand, 67, Indian playback singer, COVID-19.
Yitzhak Arad, 94, Israeli military officer and historian, director of Yad Vashem (1972–1993).
Paul Aulagnier, 77, French Traditionalist Catholic priest, co-founder of the Institute of the Good Shepherd.
Jim Bertelsen, 71, American football player (Los Angeles Rams).
Basil Bhuriya, 65, Indian Roman Catholic prelate, bishop of Jhabua (since 2015), complications from COVID-19.
David Bulow, 41, American soccer player (Dungannon Swifts, Richmond Kickers), stroke.
Prateek Chaudhuri, 49, Indian sitarist, COVID-19.
Daniele Cioni, 62, Italian Olympic sport shooter (1984, 1988, 1992), COVID-19.
Comagan, 48, Indian singer, composer and actor, COVID-19.
David H. Gambrell, 91, American politician, senator (1971–1972).
Carlos Timoteo Griguol, 84, Argentine football player (Atlanta) and manager (Rosario Central, Ferro Carril Oeste), COVID-19.
Shamim Hanafi, 82, Indian dramatist and literary critic, COVID-19.
Murray Hedgcock, 90, Australian cricket writer and journalist.
Dal Bahadur Kori, 64, Indian politician, Uttar Pradesh MLA (since 2017), complications from COVID-19.
Vanya Kostova, 64, Bulgarian singer (Tonika), complications from COVID-19.
Liu Xingtu, 84, Chinese agronomist, member of the Chinese Academy of Engineering.
Bhaskar Maiya, 70, Indian author, scholar and translator, COVID-19.
Graham Mander, 89, New Zealand Olympic sailor (1968).
Philip P. Mason, 94, American archivist and author.
Humberto Maturana, 92, Chilean philosopher (Autopoiesis and Cognition: The Realization of the Living) and biologist.
Mohan Mishra, 83, Indian physician.
Kentaro Miura, 54, Japanese manga artist (Berserk, Japan, King of Wolves), aortic dissection.
G. Muniratnam, 85, Indian social worker, COVID-19.
Guillermo Murray, 93, Argentine-born Mexican actor (Alfonsina, The Chinese Room, The Rebellious Novice), complications from dementia.
Jacques Nihoul, 83, Belgian marine biologist.
John Ntegyereize, 74, Ugandan Anglican prelate, bishop of Kinkiizi (1995–2010).
Pandu, 74, Indian actor (Karaiyellam Shenbagapoo, Kadhal Kottai, Vellachi) and comedian, COVID-19.
Georges Perron, 96, French Roman Catholic prelate, bishop of Djibouti (1992–2001).
Prem Dhoj Pradhan, 82, Nepalese musician.
Palamadai Muthuswamy Ramachandran, 86, Indian air force officer, vice chief of the Air Staff (1991–1993).
Christophe Revault, 49, French footballer (Paris Saint-Germain, Toulouse, Le Havre).
Sumbul Shahid, 66–67, Pakistani actress (Dekho Chaand Aaya, Meri Behan Meri Dewrani, Aik Aur Sitam Hai), COVID-19.
Prakashchandra Pandurang Shirodkar, 80, Indian archaeologist and politician.
Ajit Singh, 82, Indian politician, MP (1989–2014), minister of civil aviation (2011–2014) and commerce and industry (1989–1990), COVID-19.
Matang Sinh, 67, Indian politician, MP (1992–1998), complications from COVID-19.
Bhagwati Dhar Vajpayee, 96, Indian journalist, heart attack.
Paul Van Doren, 90, American entrepreneur, co-founder of Vans.
Karl Wirsum, 81, American artist, cardiac arrest.
Felix Zabala, 83, Cuban-born American boxing promoter.

7
Aisha Alhassan, 61, Nigerian lawyer and politician, senator (2011–2015).
Ernest Angley, 99, American evangelist.
Ananda Gopal Bandopadhyay, 79, Indian tabla player, COVID-19.
Courtenay Bartholomew, 89, Trinidadian physician.
Vanraj Bhatia, 93, Indian composer (Tamas, 36 Chowringhee Lane, Ramayana: The Legend of Prince Rama).
Cassiano, 77, Brazilian singer-songwriter and guitarist.
M. Y. Eqbal, 70, Indian jurist, judge of the Supreme Court (2012–2016) and chief justice of Madras High Court (2010–2013), COVID-19.
Emmanuel Erskine, 86, Ghanaian military officer, chief of army staff (1972–1974), commander of UNIFIL (1978–1981) and UNTSO (1976–1978, 1981–1986).
Antoni Gausí, 93, Spanish football player (Real Madrid, Real Zaragoza) and executive (UE Lleida).
Pál Gömöry, 85, Hungarian Olympic sailor (1968).
Hubert Hughes, 87, Anguillan politician, chief minister (1994–2000, 2010–2015).
Heinz Hölscher, 95, German cinematographer (Two People, Dead Body on Broadway, Starke Zeiten).
Abdullahi Sheikh Ismail, 80–81, Somalian diplomat, minister of foreign affairs (2004–2006).
John Kay, 77, British journalist (The Sun).
Tawny Kitaen, 59, American actress (The Perils of Gwendoline in the Land of the Yik-Yak, Bachelor Party, Witchboard), dilated cardiomyopathy.
Oleg Krivonogov, 82, Russian diplomat, ambassador to Luxembourg (1997–2001).
Lê Thụy Hải, 75, Vietnamese football player (Tong Cuc Duong Sat, national team) and coach (Becamex Binh Duong FC), pancreatic cancer.
Yegor Ligachyov, 100, Russian politician, member of the Soviet Central Committee (1981–1990) and Politburo (1985–1990), second secretary of the Communist Party (1985–1990).
John Llewelyn, 93, Welsh-born Scottish photographer.
Graham Matters, 72, Australian actor (Oz).
David McCall, 81, Australian Anglican bishop of Willochra (1987–2000) and Bunbury (2000–2010).
Ram Sajan Pandey, 64, Indian academic, COVID-19.
Martín Pando, 86, Argentine footballer (Argentinos Juniors, River Plate, national team).
Cruz Reynoso, 90, American civil rights lawyer and jurist, associate justice of the Supreme Court of California (1982–1987).
Jamal Salameh, 75, Egyptian songwriter and melodist, COVID-19.
Vinod Singh, 57, Indian politician, Uttar Pradesh MLA (1996–2017), COVID-19.
John Sludden, 56, Scottish football player (Celtic, Ayr United) and manager (Bo'ness United).
Tai, 52, American Asian elephant (Larger than Life, Operation Dumbo Drop, Water for Elephants), kidney failure.
Kalthoon Thilak, 78, Indian actor (Aarilirunthu Arubathu Varai, Kalthoon), COVID-19.
Keith Waples, 97, Canadian sulky driver and horse trainer.

8
Tanveer Akhtar, Indian politician, Bihar MLC (since 2016), COVID-19.
Mixel Berhokoirigoin, 69, French farmer and activist.
Tatiana Bershadskaya, 99, Russian musicologist.
Bo, 12, American dog, presidential pet (2009–2017), cancer.
Raul Danda, 63, Angolan politician, MP (2012–2016).
Georgi Dimitrov, 62, Bulgarian football player (CSKA Sofia, national team) and manager (Marek Dupnitsa), cancer.
David K. Doyle, 89, American lieutenant general.
Pete du Pont, 86, American politician, governor of Delaware (1977–1985), member of the Delaware (1969–1971) and U.S. House of Representatives (1971–1977).
Fadeli, 65, Indonesian politician, regent of Lamongan (2010–2015, 2016–2021).
Graeme Ferguson, 91, Canadian filmmaker, co-inventor of IMAX, cancer.
Donald L. Friedrich, 91, American politician, member of the Minnesota House of Representatives (1975–1981).
Curtis Fuller, 88, American jazz trombonist.
Aurelia Greene, 86, American politician, member of the New York State Assembly (1982–2009).
Miodrag Gvozdenović, 76, Serbian volleyball player (Yugoslavia national team).
Eula Hall, 93, American healthcare activist.
Ronald Inglehart, 86, American political scientist (Inglehart–Welzel cultural map of the world).
Helmut Jahn, 81, German-American architect (Liberty Place, James R. Thompson Center, 50 West Street), traffic collision.
Theodore Katsanevas, 74, Greek academic and politician, MP (1989–2004) and founder of Drachmi Greek Democratic Movement Five Stars, COVID-19.
Khat Thi, 44–45, Burmese poet and protester.
Maharaj Krishan Kaushik, 66, Indian field hockey player, Olympic champion (1980), COVID-19.
Pantelis Kouros, 88, Cypriot politician, deputy minister to the president (1993–2003).
Lee Han-dong, 86, South Korean politician, prime minister (2000–2002).
German Lorca, 98, Brazilian photographer.
Low Yow Chuan, 88, Malaysian real estate developer.
Cal Luther, 93, American basketball coach (Murray State Racers, UT Martin Skyhawks, Longwood Lancers).
Jean Maran, 101, French politician, deputy (1986–1988) and mayor of Sainte-Luce, Martinique (1965–1990), heart failure.
S. A. E. Nababan, 87, Indonesian Lutheran prelate.
Sanda Oumarou, 38, Cameroonian footballer (Coton Sport, Al Masry).
Don Parrish, 66, American football player (Kansas City Chiefs).
Gordon Pettengill, 95, American radio astronomer, congestive heart failure.
Jean-Luc Phaneuf, 65, Canadian ice hockey player (Toronto Toros, Birmingham Bulls).
Jean-Claude Romer, 88, French actor, film critic and film historian.
Shakeel Ahmed Samdani, 59, Indian academic, COVID-19.
Miguel Schweitzer Walters, 80, Chilean lawyer and diplomat, minister of foreign affairs (1983), ambassador to the United Kingdom (1980–1983).
Eleanor Bernert Sheldon, 101, American sociologist, president of the SSRC (1972–1979).
Spencer Silver, 80, American chemist, co-inventor of Post-it Notes.
Ravinder Pal Singh, 60, Indian field hockey player, Olympic champion (1980), COVID-19.
George Skudder, 73, New Zealand rugby union player (Waikato, New Zealand Māori, national team).
Rana Waitai, 78, New Zealand politician, MP (1996–1999).
Robert Walpole, 10th Baron Walpole, 82, British hereditary peer, member of the House of Lords (1999–2017).
Asfaw Yemiru, 78–79, Ethiopian educator.

9
Ahmed Al Khattab, 78–79, Jordanian politician, minister of agriculture (2011–2013) and MP (1997–2001).
Jacques Bouveresse, 80, French philosopher.
José Manuel Caballero Bonald, 94, Spanish poet and novelist, Miguel de Cervantes Prize winner (2012).
Monique Cerisier-ben Guiga, 78, French politician, senator (1992–2011).
Neil Connery, 82, Scottish actor (O.K. Connery, The Body Stealers).
James Dean, 35, English footballer (Stalybridge Celtic, Chorley, Halifax Town). (body discovered on this date)
Marye Anne Fox, 73, American chemist and academic administrator, chancellor of North Carolina State University (1998–2004) and the University of California, San Diego (2004–2012).
Alec Graham, 91, British Anglican prelate, bishop of Newcastle (1981–1997).
Karl-Günther von Hase, 103, German diplomat, ambassador to the United Kingdom (1970–1977), director of ZDF (1977–1982).
George Hovland, 94, American Olympic cross country skier (1952).
Meindert Leerling, 85, Dutch journalist and politician, member of the Second Chamber (1981–1994).
Miguel Lifschitz, 65, Argentine politician, governor of Santa Fe (2015–2019) and mayor of Rosario, Santa Fe (2003–2011), COVID-19.
Raghunath Mohapatra, 78, Indian architect, sculptor and politician, MP (since 2018), COVID-19.
Chris Newman, 67, American musician, cancer.
Bruno Oldani, 85, Swiss designer.
Dhiru Parikh, 87, Indian poet and editor.
Bratislav Petković, 72, Serbian film and theater director and playwright, minister of culture and information (2012–2013).
Nandivada Rathnasree, 57, Indian astrophysicist, COVID-19.
K. B. Shanappa, 82, Indian politician, MP (2006–2012), COVID-19.
Viliam Turčány, 93, Slovak poet, translator and writer.
Marion Walter, 92, German-born American mathematician.
Robert Ward, 68, American politician, member (1984–2007) and minority leader (1994–2007) of the Connecticut House of Representatives (1994–2007), kidney failure.

10
Maurice Adevah-Pœuf, 78, French politician, deputy (1981–1993, 1997–2002), mayor of Thiers (1977–2001).
Sami Hasan Al Nash, 64, Yemeni football manager (national team), COVID-19.
Miguel Arellano, 80, Mexican Olympic basketball player (1964, 1968), cancer.
Josep Maria Batlle i Farran, 71, Spanish politician, senator (2002–2011) and mayor of Puigverd de Lleida (1979–2003), tractor accident.
Lars-Gunnar Bodin, 85, Swedish electronic musician.
Frank Brazier, 87, Australian Olympic cyclist (1956, 1960, 1964).
Salem Chandrasekharan, Indian film producer (Sullan, Ghajini, Sabari), COVID-19.
Haralambie Corbu, 91, Moldovan philologist, member of the Academy of Sciences of Moldova.
Marc Daniëls, 61, Belgian comic book artist, COVID-19.
Brendan Edwards, 85, Australian footballer (Hawthorn).
Michel Fourniret, 79, French serial killer, respiratory failure.
Fortunato Franco, 84, Indian footballer (Salgaocar, Maharashtra, national team).
Art Gensler, 85, American architect, founder of Gensler.
Alan Hardman, 83, English rugby league player (St Helens, Liverpool Stanley, national team).
Inaya Jaber, 62, Lebanese writer and journalist.
Kevin Jackson, 66, English writer, broadcaster and filmmaker.
Dennis Joseph, 63, Indian screenwriter (Nirakkoottu, Rajavinte Makan) and film director (Manu Uncle), stroke.
Jerome Kagan, 92, American psychologist.
Sambhajirao Kakade, 89, Indian politician, MP (1977–1979, 1984–1989).
Jenny King, 92, New Zealand librarian.
Cristopher Mansilla, 30, Chilean track and road cyclist, COVID-19.
Néstor Montelongo, 66, Uruguayan footballer (national team), 1983 Copa América winner.
Johannes Møllehave, 84, Danish Lutheran priest and theologian.
Dieudonné Ntep, 61, Cameroonian Olympic cyclist (1984).
B. Prasada Rao, 65, Indian police officer, DGP of Andhra Pradesh (2013–2014), cardiac arrest.
Rasa Singh Rawat, 79, Indian politician, MP (1989–2004).
Froy Salinas, 81, American politician, member of the Texas House of Representatives (1977–1985).
Richie Scheinblum, 78, American baseball player (Cleveland Indians).
Abdolvahab Shahidi, 98, Iranian barbat player, singer and composer, heart disease.
Giosuè Stucchi, 90, Italian footballer (Udinese, Roma, Brescia).
Joker Thulasi, 71, Indian actor (Thamizhachi, Udan Pirappu, Mannai Thottu Kumbidanum) and comedian, COVID-19.
Svante Thuresson, 84, Swedish jazz musician ("Nygammal vals").
Pauline Tinsley, 93, British soprano.

11
Vahur Afanasjev, 41, Estonian writer.
Victor Asirvatham, 80, Malaysian Olympic runner (1968).
Henri Beaujean, 95, Guadeloupean politician, deputy of the French National Assembly (1986–1988).
Serge Bouchard, 73, Canadian anthropologist and writer.
Colt Brennan, 37, American football player (Hawaii Rainbow Warriors, Washington Redskins).
Janine Brookner, 80, American lawyer and CIA agent, complications from kidney disease and cancer.
Dan W. Brown, 70, American politician, member of the Missouri House of Representatives (2008–2010) and Senate (2011–2019).
John Castellani, 94, American basketball coach (Seattle Redhawks).
Attila Demény, 66, Hungarian composer and theatre director.
Greg Findlay, 78, Canadian football player (BC Lions).
K. R. Gouri Amma, 101, Indian politician, Travancore–Cochin (1951–1957) and Kerala MLA (1960–1965, 1970–1977, 1982–1996, 2001–2006).
Madampu Kunjukuttan, 79, Indian screenwriter (Parinamam) and actor (Aanachandam, Agninakshathram), COVID-19.
Bernard Lachance, 46, Canadian singer-songwriter and conspiracy theorist, complications from AIDS.
Christine Laprell, 71, German Olympic alpine skier (1968).
Norman Lloyd, 106, American actor (St. Elsewhere, Limelight), producer and director (Alfred Hitchcock Presents).
Rashid Meer, 70, Indian poet and editor (Dhabak), COVID-19.
Michael Monfils, 82, American politician, mayor of Green Bay, Wisconsin (1975–1979).
Richard Nonas, 85, American sculptor.
Mats Nyby, 74, Finnish politician, MP (1983–1999).
Wilfried Peffgen, 78, German Olympic cyclist (1964).
Nellai Siva, 69, Indian actor (Mahaprabhu, Vetri Kodi Kattu, Kannum Kannum).
Buddy Van Horn, 92, American stunt performer (High Plains Drifter, Pale Rider) and film director (The Dead Pool).
Frank Warrick, 76, Australian television journalist and newsreader (BTQ).
Lester L. Wolff, 102, American politician, member of the U.S. House of Representatives (1965–1981).
Chuck Welke, 67, American politician, member of the South Dakota Senate (2013–2015).
Vladislav Yegin, 32, Russian ice hockey player (Spartak Moscow, Avtomobilist Yekaterinburg), complications from COVID-19.

12
Tofig Aghahuseynov, 98, Azerbaijani military leader.
Homen Borgohain, 88, Indian journalist (Niyomiya Barta) and novelist, complications from COVID-19.
Jerry Burns, 94, American football coach (Iowa Hawkeyes, Minnesota Vikings).
Fred Buttsworth, 93, Australian footballer (West Perth, Essendon).
Venugopal Chandrasekhar, 63, Indian table tennis player, COVID-19.
Ubiratan D'Ambrosio, 88, Brazilian mathematician.
Patrick Dean, 45, American cartoonist, complications from amyotrophic lateral sclerosis.
Seamus Deane, 81, Northern Irish poet and writer (Reading in the Dark).
Nick Downie, 74, British journalist and soldier, COVID-19.
Jiří Feureisl, 89, Czech footballer (FC Karlovy Vary) and ice hockey player.
Hurley Goodall, 93, American politician, member of the Indiana House of Representatives (1978–1992).
Louis De Grève, 91, Belgian politician and jurist, senator (1974–1977), MP (1977–1984), and judge of the Court of Arbitration (1984–1999).
Dixie Hale, 85, Irish footballer (Waterford).
Rajeev Karwal, 58, Indian businessman, COVID-19.
Jim Klobuchar, 93, American journalist and author (Star Tribune).
Bob Koester, 88, American music executive, founder of Delmark Records.
Kira Kreylis-Petrova, 89, Russian actress (Drumroll, Window to Paris, Russian Symphony).
Vadim Logunov, 53, Russian footballer (Metallurg Lipetsk, APK Azov, Krystal Kherson).
Maran, 48, Indian actor and singer (Ghilli), COVID-19.
Tatiana Nikonova, 43, Russian feminist, journalist, and sex educator.
Luigi Panigazzi, 96, Italian partisan and politician, senator (1983–1987).
Ton Pansier, 74, Dutch footballer (XerxesDZB, SV SVV).
Francisco Pelló Hernandis, 85, Spanish-born Argentine painter, sculptor and poet, heart failure.
Vladimír Príkazský, 85, Czech journalist and politician, minister without portfolio (1990).
Ján Repák, 65, Slovak Olympic volleyball player (1980).
Ivanildo Rozenblad, 24, Surinamese footballer (S.V. Robinhood).
Stephen Sternberg, 100, American pathologist.
Jack Terricloth, 50, American musician (The World/Inferno Friendship Society).
Ralph Turlington, 100, American politician, member (1950–1974) and speaker (1967–1969) of the Florida House of Representatives, Florida commissioner of education (1974–1986).
Higinio Vélez, 73, Cuban baseball coach (Santiago de Cuba, national team), COVID-19.

13
Maria João Abreu, 57, Portuguese actress (Golpe de Sorte, Mar Salgado, Amor Maior), ruptured brain aneurysm.
Raymond Biaussat, 89, French painter.
Rick Brennan, 52, American rear admiral.
Nona Conner, 37, American activist.
Hal de Becker, 89, American dancer and writer.
*K. M. Hamsa Kunju, 79, Indian politician, Kerala MLA (1982–1986), cardiac arrest.
Indu Jain, 84, Indian publishing executive, chairperson of The Times Group, complications of COVID-19.
Olivier Jean-Marie, 61, French animator (Go West! A Lucky Luke Adventure, Zig & Sharko, Oggy and the Cockroaches), cancer.
Dieter Lindner, 84, German racewalker, Olympic silver medalist (1964) and European champion (1966).
Nelson Marcenaro, 68, Uruguayan footballer (national team), 1980 Mundialito winner, heart attack.
Kenneth Mayhew, 104, British army officer, Military William Order recipient (1946).
Eigil Misser, 87, Danish footballer (B 1913, national team).
Abel Murrieta Gutiérrez, 58, Mexican politician and lawyer (LeBarón and Langford families massacre), deputy (2015–2018), shot.
Božidar Nikolić, 79, Serbian film director (Balkan Spy, The Dark Side of the Sun, Three Tickets to Hollywood).
Alberto Piccinini, 79, Argentine politician and trade unionist, member of the Constitutional Assembly (1994) and deputy (2001–2005), cardiorespiratory arrest.
Feodor Pitcairn, 86, American photographer and environmentalist.
Norman Simmons, 91, American pianist, arranger ("Wade in the Water"), and composer.
Christa Stubnick, 87, German Olympic sprinter, silver medalist (1956).
Pablo Uribe, 90, Colombian Olympic fencer (1956).
George Wallerstein, 90, American astronomer.

14
Sándor Balassa, 86, Hungarian composer.
Jay Barbree, 87, American space travel news correspondent (NBC News).
Otto Beatty Jr., 81, American politician, member of the Ohio House of Representatives (1980–1999).
R. L. Bhatia, 100, Indian politician, MP (1971–1977, 1980–1989, 1991–2004), governor of Kerala (2004–2008) and Bihar (2008–2009), COVID-19.
Torkild Brakstad, 75, Norwegian football player (Molde, national team) and manager (Tromsø).
Glenn R. Croshaw, 70, American judge and politician, member of the Virginia House of Delegates (1987–2000).
Eveline Cruickshanks, 94, British political historian.
Barry Fry, 81, Canadian curler.
Milan Ftáčnik, 64, Slovak politician, mayor of Bratislava (2010–2014).
Jaime Garza, 67, Mexican actor (Navajeros, Missing, The Falcon and the Snowman), complications from diabetes.
Raimund Hoghe, 72, German dancer, choreographer and author.
Bob Jones, 81, American college basketball coach (Kentucky Wesleyan Panthers).
Hartley Joynt, 82, Australian cricketer (Western Australia).
Haziq Kamaruddin, 27, Malaysian Olympic archer (2012).
Masao Kawai, 97, Japanese primatologist.
Igor Lavrinenko, 60, Belarusian politician, member of the House of Representatives (since 2019).
Ester Mägi, 99, Estonian composer.
David McPhail, 76, New Zealand comedian and actor (A Week of It, Letter to Blanchy, Seven Periods with Mr Gormsby).
Kanaka Murthy, 78, Indian sculptor, COVID-19.
New Jack, 58, American professional wrestler (SMW, ECW, XPW), heart attack.
Jorge Picciani, 66, Brazilian politician, Rio de Janeiro MLA (2003–2010), prostate cancer.
Ward C. Pitfield Jr., 95, Canadian financier and Thoroughbred racehorse owner.
Farooq Qaiser, 75, Pakistani puppeteer (Uncle Sargam), cardiac arrest.
María Amalia Revelo, 65, Costa Rican businesswoman, minister of tourism (2018–2020).
Lee Ross, 78, Canadian-born American psychologist.
Waltraut Schälike, 94, German-Russian historian.
Matheus Shikongo, 70, Namibian politician and businessman, mayor of Windhoek (1993–2010), COVID-19.
Jarnail Singh, 48, Indian journalist and politician, Delhi MLA (2015–2017), COVID-19.
Wang Yuan, 91, Chinese mathematician, member of the Chinese Academy of Sciences.
Ramendra Kumar Yadav, 78, Indian politician, MP (1989–1991, 1992–2004).

15
Mildred Allen, 91, American opera singer.
Nelly Reig Castellanos, 92, Paraguayan first lady (1989–1993).
Jim Clendenen, 68, American vintner (Au Bon Climat).
Fred Dellar, 89, British music journalist.
Charles R. Doering, 65, American mathematician, esophageal cancer.
Felicia Elizondo, 74, American transgender activist.
Tim Falvey, 87, Irish politician, lord mayor of Cork (1994–1995).
Deanna Milvia Frosini, 81, Italian painter and actress (Under the Sign of Scorpio, Wind from the East, Lettera aperta a un giornale della sera).
Oliver Gillie, 83, British medical journalist and scientist, lymphocytic leukemia.
M. Thomas Inge, 85, American comics scholar.
Sunil Jain, 58, Indian journalist, complications from COVID-19.
Babak Khorramdin, 46, Iranian director and writer.
Ivo Luís Knoll, 91, Brazilian politician, Santa Catarina MLA (1967–1971).
Lim Heng Chek, 85, Malaysian Olympic swimmer (1956).
George Little, 83, Scottish-born Canadian politician.
Emily Mair, 92, Scottish-born New Zealand opera singer, pianist and vocal coach.
Đorđe Marjanović, 89, Serbian singer.
Fred Martinelli, 92, American Hall of Fame college football coach (Ashland University).
Mario Pavone, 80, American jazz bassist.
Carol Rudyard, 98, English-Australian visual artist.
Roy Scammell, 88, British stuntman and actor (Alien, Willow, Flash Gordon).
Karl Schleunes, 84, American Holocaust historian.
John Rosolu Bankole Thompson, 84, Sierra Leonean jurist, judge of the Special Court (2002–2013) and chair of the Anti-corruption Commission (since 2018).
Eva Wilma, 87, Brazilian actress (Alô, Doçura!, A Flea on the Scales, A Indomada), ovarian cancer.

16
Nadia Al-Iraqia, 57, Iraqi actress (Africano), COVID-19.
Anjan Bandyopadhyay, 55, Indian television journalist, complications from COVID-19.
Stefan Banz, 60, Swiss artist, heart attack.
William Berg, 82, American classicist.
Lawrence M. Breed, 80, American APL computer scientist and early Burning Man contributor, Lewy body dementias.
Patsy Bruce, 81, American country songwriter ("Mammas Don't Let Your Babies Grow Up to Be Cowboys").
Marianne Burgman, 68, Dutch politician, mayor of Maarn (1995–2002) and De Ronde Venen (2002–2011).
Mike Carter, 67, American politician, member of the Tennessee House of Representatives (since 2013), pancreatic cancer.
Bruno Covas, 41, Brazilian politician, mayor of São Paulo (since 2018), deputy (2015–2017) and São Paulo MLA (2007–2011), gastric cancer.
Vera Deacon, 94, Australian historian.
Tomer Eiges, 25, Israeli intelligence officer.
Hüseyin Er, 36, Turkish-British footballer (İzmirspor), heart attack.
Samir Hadjaoui, 42, Algerian footballer (ASO Chlef, ES Sétif, national team).
Anatoliy Havrylov, 88, Ukrainian cinematographer, Shevchenko National Prize winner (1988).
Rajendrasinh Jadeja, 66, Indian cricket player (Saurashtra) and umpire (BCCI), COVID-19.
Chetan Karki, 83, Nepali songwriter and filmmaker, COVID-19.
Nasim Wali Khan, 88, Pakistani politician, Khyber Pakhtunkhwa MPA (1977), complications from diabetes.
Ailsa Land, 93, British mathematician.
Jakov Lazaroski, 84, Macedonian political commissar, president of the League of Communists of Macedonia (1986–1989).
Hilarie Lindsay, 99, Australian toy manufacturer and writer. (death announced on this date)
MC Kevin, 23, Brazilian singer-songwriter, fall.
Rildo da Costa Menezes, 79, Brazilian football player (Botafogo, national team) and manager (California Kickers).
Boris Miranda, 37, Bolivian journalist and correspondent (BBC Mundo).
Al Taib Mustafa, Sudanese journalist and politician, minister of state for communications, COVID-19.
M. S. Narasimhan, 88, Indian mathematician (Narasimhan–Seshadri theorem).
Raili Pietilä, 94, Finnish architect (Mäntyniemi).
Richard L. Rubenstein, 97, American rabbi and writer.
Sa'duddin, 59, Indonesian politician, regent of Bekasi (2007–2012), member of the People's Representative Council (2014–2016).
*Sangtiennoi Sor.Rungroj, 54, Thai Muay Thai fighter, suicide by gunshot.
Rajeev Satav, 46, Indian politician, MP (2014–2019, since 2020), complications from COVID-19.
Alessandro Talotti, 40, Italian Olympic high jumper (2004, 2008), stomach cancer.
Akbar Torkan, 68, Iranian politician, minister of defense (1989–1993), minister of roads and transportation (1993–1997), senior advisor to the president (2013–2018).
Ekaterina Vilmont, 75, Russian writer.
Joe Walters, 81, English cricketer (Nottinghamshire).
Jerzy Wilk, 66, Polish politician, mayor of Elbląg (2013–2014), deputy (since 2015).
Vijay Singh Yadav, 67–68, Indian politician, Bihar MLA (1995–2000), MP (2000–2006), COVID-19.
Rudolf Yanson, 82, Russian philologist.

17
K. K. Aggarwal, 62, Indian cardiologist, COVID-19.
Ian Brusasco, 92, Australian businessman and philanthropist.
Kabang, 13, Filipino dog.
Don Kernodle, 71, American professional wrestler (Jim Crockett Promotions), suicide.
Nan Kinross, 94, New Zealand nurse and nursing academic.
Bruno Kouamé, 93, Ivorian Roman Catholic prelate, bishop of Abengourou (1981–2003).
Casildo Maldaner, 79, Brazilian politician, senator (since 2011) and governor of Santa Catarina (1990–1991), cancer.
Jackie Matisse, 90, French artist.
Joe Mercer, 86, English jockey.
Amarendra Mohanty, 63, Indian music composer and singer, COVID-19.
Robert Quackenbush, 91, American children's author.
Ki. Rajanarayanan, 97, Indian folklorist and writer.
Terence Riley, 66, American architect and museum curator, chief curator of architecture and design at the Museum of Modern Art (1992–2006).
Buddy Roemer, 77, American politician, member of the U.S. House of Representatives (1981–1988), governor of Louisiana (1988–1992).
Don Sakers, 62, American science fiction writer, heart attack.
Jesús Santrich, 53, Colombian guerrilla leader (FARC) and politician, deputy (2006–2009), shot.
Henry Schmidt, 85, American football player (San Francisco 49ers, San Diego Chargers, Buffalo Bills).
Janet Shackleton, 92, New Zealand hurdler, British Empire Games bronze medallist (1950).
Héctor Silva, 76, Argentine rugby union player (South American Jaguars) and coach (national team), COVID-19.
K. Thurairetnasingam, 80, Sri Lankan politician, MP (2002–2010, 2015–2020), COVID-19.
K. Thulasiah Vandayar, 92, Indian politician, MP (1991–1996).
Nitish Veera, 45, Indian actor (Pudhupettai, Vennila Kabadi Kuzhu, Kaala), COVID-19.
Sabino Vengco, 79, Filipino Roman Catholic priest, theologian, and author.
Vivek Raj Wangkhem, Indian politician, Manipur MLA (2002–2007), general secretary of the National People's Party, COVID-19.
Wolfgang Weiermann, 85, German politician, MP (1987–2002).
Magdeleine Willame-Boonen, 80, Belgian politician, senator (1999–2003).
Olavo Yépez, 83, Ecuadorian chess master, cancer.

18
Abdul Khaleq Alghanem, 63, Saudi Arabian film and TV director (Tash ma Tash), prostate cancer.
Franco Battiato, 76, Italian singer-songwriter (La voce del Padrone, Orizzonti perduti, Mondi lontanissimi) and filmmaker, neurodegenerative disease.
Viktor Belskiy, 66, Belarusian Olympic long jumper (1980).
Effie Boggess, 93, American politician, member of the Iowa House of Representatives (1995–2005).
Joe J. Christensen, 91, American Mormon leader, president of Ricks College (1985–1989), general authority (since 1989).
Theodore John Conrad, 71, American bank embezzler.
Bob Cullison, 84, American politician, member of the Oklahoma House of Representatives (1973–1979) and Senate (1979–1995).
Esegé, 63, Spanish comic artist (Mortadelo, Mister K).
Bernhard Friedmann, 89, German economist and politician, MP (1976–1990) and member of the European Court of Auditors (1990–2001).
Vladimir Fyodorov, 82, Russian actor (Ruslan and Ludmila, Kin-dza-dza!, Heart of a Dog) and physicist.
John Gomery, 88, Canadian jurist, justice of the Superior Court of Quebec (1982–2007).
Charles Grodin, 86, American actor (The Heartbreak Kid, Midnight Run, Beethoven) and comedian, Emmy winner (1978), bone marrow cancer.
Chaman Lal Gupta, 86, Indian politician, Jammu and Kashmir MLA (1972–1977) and MP (1996–2004), complications from COVID-19.
Arthur Hills, 91, American golf course designer.
Vijay Kumar Kashyap, 56, Indian politician, Uttar Pradesh MLA (since 2017), COVID-19.
Zsuzsanna Kézi, 76, Hungarian Olympic handball player, bronze medalist (1976).
Kim Ho-seong, 51, South Korean voice actor.
Ricardo Letts Colmenares, 83, Peruvian politician and journalist, founder of the Revolutionary Vanguard and congressman (1990–1992).
Gilles Lupien, 67, Canadian ice hockey player (Montreal Canadiens, Pittsburgh Penguins, Hartford Whalers), Stanley Cup champion (1978, 1979), intestinal cancer.
Hiroshi Maeda, 82, Japanese chemist, discoverer of the EPR effect, liver failure.
Malibu Moon, 24, American racehorse and sire, heart attack.
Douglas Mossman, 88, American actor (Hawaii Five-O, Hawaiian Eye).
Terry O'Dea, 76, Australian darts player.
Albert Planasdemunt i Gubert, 91, Spanish politician, member of the Parliament of Catalonia (1980–1984).
Farida Rahman, 75, Bangladeshi politician, MP (2009–2013).
William C. Richardson, 81, American businessman.
Chrissy Sharp, 73, Australian politician, member of the Western Australian Legislative Council (1997–2005).
Thaddeus Spratlen, 90, American economist.
Rennie Stennett, 72, Panamanian baseball player (Pittsburgh Pirates, San Francisco Giants), World Series champion (1979), cancer.
Yolanda Tortolero, Venezuelan physician and politician, deputy (since 2016), complications from COVID-19.
Yoshi Wada, 77, Japanese sound installation artist and musician.
Genzō Wakayama, 88, Japanese voice actor (Astro Boy, Shin Takarajima, Kingdom Hearts), heart failure.
Corinne Wood, 66, American politician, lieutenant governor of Illinois (1999–2003), complications from breast cancer.

19
Darío Alessandro, 69, Argentine sociologist, politician and diplomat, deputy (1995–2003), ambassador to Cuba (2004–2007) and Peru (2008–2015), pancreatic cancer.
Wiranto Arismunandar, 87, Indonesian academic, minister of education (1998).
Johnny Ashcroft, 94, Australian country singer.
Khadgajeet Baral, 93, Nepalese diplomat and police officer, inspector general (1972–1978).
Odd Berg, 97, Norwegian Olympic road racing cyclist (1952).
Gary Blodgett, 83, American politician, member of the Iowa House of Representatives (1993–2001).
Daryle H. Busch, 93, American inorganic chemist.
Pablo Calucho, 41, Bolivian journalist, COVID-19.
Oscar Cavagnis, 47, Italian road racing cyclist, avalanche.
Alix Dobkin, 80, American folk singer-songwriter, lesbian feminist activist and memoirist, brain aneurysm.
Piet van Eijsden, 85, Dutch tennis player.
Lee Evans, 74, American sprinter, double Olympic champion (1968), complications from a stroke.
Serhiy Ferenchak, 37, Ukrainian footballer (Khimik Krasnoperekopsk, Sevastopol, SKChF Sevastopol).
Josep Franch, 77, Spanish footballer (FC Barcelona, CE Sabadell FC).
Vladimir Gerasimov, 89, Russian colonel general, 12th Chief Directorate (1985–1992).
Martin Greenberg, 103, American poet.
Charles C. Hagemeister, 74, American soldier, Medal of Honor recipient (1968).
John Hodge, 92, British aerospace engineer, member of NASA Space Task Group, flight director.
Esther A. Hopkins, 94, American chemist, environmental lawyer and civil servant.
Quintin Jones, 41, American convicted murderer, execution by lethal injection.
Alain Kirili, 74, French-American sculptor, leukemia.
Zakpa Komenan, 76, Ivorian politician, minister of education and professional formation (1993–1999).
David Anthony Kraft, 68, American comic book writer (The Defenders, Captain America), complications from COVID-19.
Prasanta Mohapatra, 47, Indian cricketer (Odisha), COVID-19.
Paul Mooney, 79, American actor (The Buddy Holly Story, Bamboozled), comedian (Chappelle's Show) and writer, heart attack.
Robin Munro, 68, British human rights activist.
Neville Myton, 74, Jamaican Olympic middle-distance runner (1964, 1968), cancer.
Jagannath Pahadia, 89, Indian politician, chief minister of Rajasthan (1980–1981), governor of Bihar (1989–1990) and Haryana (2009–2014), COVID-19.
Nicole Péllissard-Darrigrand, 89, French Olympic diver (1948, 1952, 1956, 1960).
Aleksandr Privalov, 87, Russian biathlete, Olympic silver medallist (1964), heart attack.
Tatyana Protsenko, 53, Russian actress (The Adventures of Buratino), cancer.
Elisa Ruiz Díaz, 56, Paraguayan lawyer and diplomat, representative to the Organization of American States (since 2013) and chair of the OAS Permanent Council (since 2021) .
Guillermo Sepúlveda, 86, Mexican footballer (Guadalajara, Oro, national team).
Abubakar Shekau, 46–56, Nigerian Islamic militant, leader of Boko Haram (since 2009), suicide by explosive vest.
Martin Turnovský, 92, Czech conductor.
Aimé Verhoeven, 85, Belgian Olympic Greco-Roman wrestler (1960).
Helmut Wopfner, 96, Austrian geologist.
Wimar Witoelar, 75, Indonesian journalist and talk show host, presidential press secretary (1999–2001), complications from sepsis.
Oğuz Yılmaz, 52, Turkish folk musician, heart attack.
Mark York, 55, American television and film actor (The Office).

20
Nizamuddin Asir Adrawi, 95, Indian historian.
Len Badger, 75, English footballer (Sheffield United).
Francisco Brines, 89, Spanish poet and academic, Miguel de Cervantes Prize winner.
Lori Burton, 80, American singer, songwriter and record producer.
Chris Chilton, 77, English footballer (Hull City, Coventry City), complications from dementia.
Glen E. Conrad, 71, American jurist, judge (since 2003) and chief judge (2010–2017) of the U.S. District Court for Western Virginia.
Ingvar Cronhammar, 73, Swedish-Danish sculptor (Elia).
Jesús Davoz Gorrotxategi, 89, Spanish road racing cyclist.
Ion Dichiseanu, 87, Romanian actor (Kampf um Rom, Titanic Waltz, Mofturi 1900).
Tommy Finn, 87, English rugby league player (Hull, St Helens).
Ken Garland, 92, British graphic designer.
Samir Ghanem, 84, Egyptian comedian, singer and entertainer, complications from COVID-19.
Gregorio Gordo, 62, Spanish politician and trade unionist, member of the Assembly of Madrid (2007–2015), cancer.
Khatib Haji, 58, Tanzanian politician, MP (since 2010).
Roger Hawkins, 75, American drummer (Muscle Shoals Rhythm Section) and recording studio owner (Muscle Shoals Sound Studio).
Gennady Igumnov, 84, Russian politician, governor of Perm Oblast (1996–2000).
George F. Keane, 91, American investment professional.
Anthony Lazzaro, 100, American academic administrator.
Lubomír Ledl, 68, Czech politician, member of the Federal Assembly of Czechoslovakia (1990–1992).
Phil Lombardi, 58, American baseball player (New York Yankees, New York Mets), complications from brain cancer.
Irom Maipak, 53, Indian cinematographer (Ashangba Nongjabi, Leipaklei, Nongphadok Lakpa Atithi), COVID-19.
Margherita Marchione, 99, American Roman Catholic nun and writer.
Robbie McCauley, 78, American playwright and actress.
Freddy Marks, 71, English musician (Rod, Jane and Freddy) and actor.
Erin O'Brien, 87, American actress (John Paul Jones, Onionhead, Girl on the Run).
Florian Pilkington-Miksa, 70, English rock drummer (Curved Air).
Jerry Planutis, 91, American football player (Washington Redskins).
John Powless, 88, American college basketball coach (Wisconsin Badgers).
Sándor Puhl, 65, Hungarian football referee, complications from COVID-19.
U. Visweswar Rao, Indian film director (Nagna Sathyam, Harischandrudu) and screenwriter, COVID-19.
Tarannum Riyaz, 60, Indian writer, COVID-19.
Rizuan Abdul Hamid, Malaysian businessman and politician, senator (since 2005) and chairman of Halal Development Corporation (since 2019), COVID-19.
Ray Thomas, 80, Australian footballer (Collingwood).
Fred Tobias, 93, American songwriter ("Good Timin'", "Little Bitty Girl", "Born Too Late").
Taygib Tolboyev, 65, Russian test pilot.
Tshoganetso Tongwane, South African politician, MP (2008–2014, 2014–2019, since 2019), COVID-19.
Mike Weatherley, 63, British politician, MP (2010–2015), lung cancer.
Johan Weyts, 81, Belgian politician, member of the Flemish Parliament (1999–2004) and senator (1987–1999).
Eric Winstanley, 76, English footballer (Barnsley, Chesterfield).
Zuo Hui, 50, Chinese real estate broker.

21
Farhat Abdraimov, 55, Kazakh actor (Whoever Softer, Fara, Tale of Pink Hare), heart attack.
Vitold Ashurak, 50, Belarusian activist and political prisoner, cardiac arrest.
Ibrahim Attahiru, 54, Nigerian military officer, chief of Army staff (since 2021), plane crash.
Sunderlal Bahuguna, 94, Indian environmentalist (Chipko movement), COVID-19.
Om Prakash Bhardwaj, 79, Indian boxing coach.
Ajoy Dey, 69, Indian politician, West Bengal MLA (1991–2016), COVID-19.
Zdzisław Dobrucki, 76, Polish speedway rider (Unia Leszno).
John A. Hemphill, 93, American major general.
Roman Kent, 92, Polish-born American Holocaust survivor, president of the International Auschwitz Committee.
Rajkumar Keswani, 70, Indian journalist, complications from COVID-19.
Rana Kharkongor, 69, Indian singer and video director, COVID-19.
Heikki Koort, 66, Estonian film actor, karateka and diplomat.
Krishna, 79, Indian politician, MP (1996–1998), member (1985–1989, 1994–1996, 2006–2008) and speaker (2004–2008) of the Karnataka Legislative Assembly.
Abdulrahman Kuliya, 53, Nigerian military office, plane crash.
Thomas B. Leary, 89, American attorney, commissioner of the Federal Trade Commission (1999–2005).
Mark Levitan, 73, American academic, complications from leukemia.
Ken MacKinnon, 87, Scottish Gaelic sociolinguist.
Usman Mansoorpuri, 76, Indian Islamic scholar, COVID-19.
Sakti Mazumdar, 89, Indian Olympic boxer (1952), heart attack.
Walter Müller, German Olympic gymnast (1952).
Merv Norrish, 94, New Zealand diplomat, ambassador to the United States (1978–1980).
Manfred Ommer, 70, German Olympic sprinter (1972).
Babagouda Patil, 76, Indian politician, minister of rural development (1998–1999).
Tahir Salahov, 92, Azerbaijani painter and draughtsman, first secretary of the Artists' Union of the USSR (1973–1992), vice president of the Russian Academy of Arts.
Dwayne Sandy, 32, Saint Vincent footballer (Pastures United FC, Avenues United FC, national team), shot.
Harvey Schlossberg, 85, American police officer.
Lisa Shaw, 44, British radio presenter and journalist, brain haemorrhage.
Klemen Tinal, 50, Indonesian politician, vice governor of Papua (since 2013).
Stephen Zappala Sr., 88, American jurist, justice (1983–2002) and chief justice (2001–2002) of the Supreme Court of Pennsylvania.

22
Francesc Arnau, 46, Spanish football player (Barcelona, Málaga) and executive (Real Oviedo), suicide.
Benjamin Ayimba, 44, Kenyan rugby union player (Nondescripts RFC, Cornish Pirates) and coach (national sevens team), cerebral malaria.
Edminas Bagdonas, 57, Lithuanian diplomat, ambassador to Italy (2001–2004), Belarus (2007–2012) and Israel (2014–2019).
Joe Beckwith, 66, American baseball player (Los Angeles Dodgers, Kansas City Royals), World Series champion (1985), colon cancer.
Colette Brull-Ulmann, 101, French physician, pediatrician, and Resistance fighter.
Jacqueline Caurat, 93, French television presenter, journalist and actress (Mon pote le gitan).
Anna Maria Cecchi, 78, Italian Olympic swimmer (1960, 1964).
Charles G. Cleveland, 93, American lieutenant general.
David Danielson, 74, American politician, member of the New Hampshire House of Representatives (since 2013), cancer.
Iain R. Edgar, 72, British social anthropologist.
Peter Fish, 65, American composer.
Fred Ford, 83, American football player (Buffalo Bills, Los Angeles Chargers).
Sister Loyola Galvin, 99, New Zealand nun, nurse and gardener.
Jorge García Carneiro, 69, Venezuelan politician, governor of Vargas (since 2008) and minister of defense (2004–2006), heart attack.
Mels Kenetaev, 75, Kazakh footballer (Dinamo Tselinograd).
Harold Lambert, 99, Australian footballer (Essendon).
Jorge Larrañaga, 64, Uruguayan politician, senator (2000–2020) and minister of the interior (since 2020), heart attack.
Charles R. Larson, 83, American scholar.
R. S. Lugani, 94, Indian educator.
Syamsuddin Mahmud, 86, Indonesian economist and politician, governor of Aceh (1993–2000), COVID-19.
Robert Marchand, 109, French racing cyclist.
Cornelia Oberlander, 99, Canadian landscape architect, COVID-19.
Raamlaxman, 78, Indian composer (Maine Pyar Kiya, Hum Aapke Hain Koun..!, Hum Saath-Saath Hain), heart attack.
André Ribeiro, 55, Brazilian racing driver (CART), bowel cancer.
Sophie Rivera, 82, American photographer.
David Shotter, 82, British archaeologist.
Y. C. Simhadri, 80, Indian academic administrator, vice-chancellor of Banaras Hindu University (1997–2002), COVID-19.
Jiřina Šiklová, 85, Czech sociologist and political dissident, Charter 77 signatory. (death announced on this date)
Pavol Szikora, 69, Slovak Olympic race walker (1988, 1992).
Marek Trončinský, 32, Czech ice hockey player (Progym Gheorgheni, Bílí Tygři Liberec, Sheffield Steelers).
Glenn Douglas Tubb, 85, American singer-songwriter ("Skip a Rope", "Two Story House").
Mario Vascellari, 69, Italian basketball player.
Wu Mengchao, 98, Chinese hepatobiliary surgeon, member of the Chinese Academy of Sciences.
Yuan Longping, 90, Chinese agronomist, member of the Chinese Academy of Engineering, multiple organ failure.
Connie Zelencik, 66, American football player (Buffalo Bills).
Eddy Zemach, 85–86, Israeli philosopher.
Chinese marathon runners killed in the Gansu ultramarathon disaster:
Huang Guanjun, 34
Liang Jing, 31

23
Dennis A'Court, 83, Welsh cricketer (Gloucestershire).
Srikumar Banerjee, 75, Indian metallurgical engineer, director of BARC (2004–2010) and chairman of the Atomic Energy Commission (2009–2012), heart attack.
Baby Barredo, 80, Filipino theater actress and producer, complications from sepsis.
Dewayne Blackwell, 84, American songwriter ("Friends in Low Places", "Mr. Blue").
Charles Boutin, 79, American politician and administrative law judge, mayor of Aberdeen, Maryland (1994–1998) and member of the Maryland House of Delegates (1999–2005).
José Agusto Briones, 60, Ecuadorian politician, minister of energy and non-renewable natural resources (2019–2020), suicide by hanging.
Eric Carle, 91, American writer and illustrator (The Very Hungry Caterpillar, The Grouchy Ladybug, Brown Bear, Brown Bear, What Do You See?), kidney failure.
Barney Curley, 81, Irish horse trainer and gambler (Yellow Sam betting coup).
Lorrae Desmond, 91, Australian singer, television presenter (The Lorrae Desmond Show) and actress (A Country Practice, Arcade).
Aly Doerfel, 71, Luxembourgish Olympic fencer (1972).
Bob Fulton, 73, English-born Australian rugby league player and coach (Manly-Warringah, Eastern Suburbs, national team), cancer.
Alan Garside, 94, Australian footballer (national team).
Milton Moses Ginsberg, 85, American film director (Coming Apart, The Werewolf of Washington), cancer.
Cristóbal Halffter, 91, Spanish classical composer and conductor.
Charles Hamlin, 74, American Olympic rower (1968).
James Harman, 74, American harmonica player and singer-songwriter, heart attack.
Malik Dohan al-Hassan, 101, Iraqi politician, minister of justice (2004–2005).
Ron Hill, 82, English Olympic marathon runner (1964, 1972).
Richard R. G. Hobson, 89, American politician, member of the Virginia House of Delegates (1976–1980).
Paulo Mendes da Rocha, 92, Brazilian architect (Estádio Serra Dourada, Pinacoteca do Estado, National Coach Museum), Pritzker Prize winner (2006).
Ahmed Mestiri, 95, Tunisian lawyer and politician, minister of the interior (1970–1971), defence (1966–1968) and justice (1956–1958).
Max Mosley, 81, British racing driver and lawyer, president of the FIA (1993–2009), suicide by gunshot.
Makoto Nagao, 84, Japanese computer scientist, president of Kyoto University (1997–2003), stroke.
John Waddington Oakes, 88, British law enforcement officer and Olympic alpine skier (1960), high sheriff of Warwickshire (1996).
Luiz Gonzaga Paes Landim, 79, Brazilian politician, Piauí MLA (1979–1991), COVID-19.
Shanti Pahadia, 86, Indian politician, MP (1984–1990), COVID-19.
Lionel Platts, 86, English golfer.
Alex Salaueu, 94, Belarusian artist.
Nina Shatskaya, 81, Russian actress (Welcome, or No Trespassing, A Man Before His Time, Visit to Minotaur), COVID-19.
Ross Taylor, 95, New Zealand geochemist and planetary scientist.
Douglas Winston, 89, Australian Olympic sprinter (1956).

24
Cabo Almi, 58, Brazilian politician, Mato Grosso MLA (since 2011), complications from COVID-19.
Josep Almudéver Mateu, 101, French veteran of the Spanish Civil War (CXXIX International Brigade).
Aung Toe, 96, Burmese jurist, chief justice of the Supreme Court (1988–2011).
Frithjof Bergmann, 90, German philosopher, founder of the New Work movement.
Paul Christy, 82, American professional wrestler (NWA, ICW, WWF).
Russell Church, 90, American psychologist.
John Davis, 66, American singer (Milli Vanilli, The Real Milli Vanilli), COVID-19.
Aldo Forbice, 80, Italian radio host.
Keith Foulger, 96, British naval architect, colorectal cancer.
Dan Frank, 67, American editor (Pantheon Books).
Banira Giri, 75, Nepalese poet, heart attack and COVID-19.
Desiree Gould, 76, American actress (Sleepaway Camp).
Robert Green Hall, 47, American makeup artist (Angel, Buffy the Vampire Slayer) and film director (Laid to Rest).
Anna Halprin, 100, American choreographer.
Jeetmal Khant, 58, Indian politician, Rajasthan MLA (2013–2018), COVID-19.
Eugene Marve, 60, American football player (Buffalo Bills, Tampa Bay Buccaneers, San Diego Chargers).
Hazen Myers, 86, Canadian politician, New Brunswick MLA (1978–1987).
Henri Paris, 85, French general.
Milan Puzrla, 75, Czech Olympic cyclist (1968, 1972, 1976).
Ron Rhodes, 88, Australian footballer (Carlton).
Najeeb Qahtan al-Shaabi, 67–68, Yemeni politician, COVID-19.
Aditya Shastri, 57, Indian academic, complications from COVID-19.
Habibullah Siraji, 72, Bangladeshi poet, director general of the Bangla Academy (since 2018).
Lyubov Talalaeva, 68, Russian rower, Olympic silver medallist (1976).
Beverly White, 92, American politician, member of the Utah House of Representatives (1971–1991), longest serving female member of the Utah State Legislature.
Samuel E. Wright, 74, American actor (The Little Mermaid, Dinosaur) and singer ("Under the Sea"), prostate cancer.
Marinette Yetna, 55, Cameroonian politician, deputy (since 2020).

25
Alfonso Barasoain, 63, Spanish football player and manager (Barakaldo, Eibar, Lemona).
Rod Breedlove, 83, American football player (Washington Redskins, Pittsburgh Steelers).
Jáchym Bulín, 86, Czech Olympic ski jumper (1956).
Pete Correll, 80, American businessman, CEO-emeritus of Georgia-Pacific (1993–2005).
Lois Ehlert, 86, American children's author and illustrator (Chicka Chicka Boom Boom).
Johnny Everard, 97, Irish hurler (Moyne-Templetuohy, Tipperary) and Gaelic footballer.
David Foot, 92, English journalist and historian.
Arturo Gentili, 85, Italian footballer (Atalanta B.C., Varese Calcio, Triestina Calcio).
Sir Roger Gifford, 65, English banker and philanthropist, lord mayor of London (2012–2013).
Gregory Peter XX Ghabroyan, 86, Syrian-born Lebanese Armenian Catholic hierarch, catholicos patriarch of Cilicia (since 2015).
Krishne Gowda, 80, Indian actor and performer, cardiac arrest.
Michael Hudson, 82, American political scientist.
Cotton Ivy, 91, American politician, member of the Tennessee House of Representatives (1985–1989).
Padmanabh Jaini, 97, Indian-born American Jainist and Buddhist scholar.
Ib Georg Jensen, 93, Danish ceramist, designer, and author.
Esmail Khoi, 83, Iranian poet and writer.
Tõnu Kilgas, 66, Estonian baritone and actor (Rahu tänav, Those Old Love Letters), cancer.
David Klein, 86, Israeli economist, governor of the Bank of Israel (2000–2005).
John Lynch, 74, Australian linguist.
Juan Máximo Martínez, 74, Mexican Olympic long-distance runner (1968, 1972), cancer.
Eilat Mazar, 64, Israeli archaeologist.
José Melitón Chávez, 63, Argentine Roman Catholic prelate, bishop of Añatuya (2015–2019) and Concepción (since 2020), COVID-19.
Bobby Mohammed, 78, Trinidadian pannist.
Elisapee Ootoova, 90, Canadian Inuit elder. (death announced on this date)
George Patterson, 86, English footballer (Hull City, York City).
David Pole, 95, English health economist.
Robert Ridder, 94, American politician, member of the Washington State Senate (1967–1973).
J. D. Roberts, 88, American football player and coach (New Orleans Saints).
Eva Sereny, 86, Swiss photographer and film director (Foreign Student).
Amichai Shoham, 99, Israeli footballer (Hapoel Petah Tikva F.C., national team).
John Warner, 94, American politician, senator (1979–2009), secretary of the Navy (1972–1974), heart failure.
Rusty Warren, 91, American comedian and singer (Knockers Up!).

26
Abdul Wahab Al-Dailami, 82–83, Yemeni politician, minister of justice (1994–1997), COVID-19.
Adrián Babič, 24, Slovak touring cyclist, traffic collision.
Jan Borgman, 91, Dutch astronomer.
Roser Bru, 98, Spanish-born Chilean painter and engraver.
Tarcisio Burgnich, 82, Italian football player (Inter Milan, Napoli, national team) and manager.
Chen Qingru, 94, Chinese scientist, member of the Chinese Academy of Engineering.
Vincent Daly, 73, Irish Gaelic footballer (Longford GAA).
Arturo de Jesús Correa Toro, 80, Colombian Roman Catholic prelate, bishop of Ipiales (2000–2018), COVID-19.
H. S. Doreswamy, 103, Indian journalist and independence activist, cardiac arrest.
Murray Dowey, 95, Canadian ice hockey player, Olympic champion (1948).
Sir Llew Edwards, 85, Australian politician, deputy premier and treasurer of Queensland (1978–1983).
Heidi Ferrer, 50, American screenwriter (Dawson's Creek, The Hottie and the Nottie, Princess), suicide.
Alastair Hanton, 94, British banker, inventor of the direct debit system.
Jerome Hellman, 92, American film producer (Midnight Cowboy, The Mosquito Coast, Coming Home), Oscar winner (1970).
Ben Kruger, 64, South African actor and author (A Case of Murder, Silent Witness, Binnelanders), complications from COVID-19.
Kay Lahusen, 91, American photographer and LGBT rights activist.
Earle Louder, 88, American euphonium player.
Arturo Luz, 94, Filipino sculptor and printmaker.
Therese McKinley, 93, American baseball player (Muskegon Lassies).
Majendra Narzary, 68, Indian politician, Assam MLA (since 2006), complications from COVID-19.
Ranjita Rane, 43, Indian cricketer (Mumbai), cancer.
Mufti Abdul Razzaq, 95, Indian Muslim scholar.
Elisabeth Rechlin, 91, German Olympic swimmer (1952).
Ren Farong, 84, Chinese Taoist priest and politician, MP (1993–2018), venerable master of the Chinese Taoist Association (2005–2015).
Kunjulekshmi Saradamoni, 93, Indian historian and economist, president of the National Federation of Indian Women (2002–2008).
Henry Sayler, 100, American politician, member of the Florida Senate (1967–1971, 1973–1978).
Sureni Senarath, 61, Sri Lankan actress (Surapurata Kanyaviyak, Aathma Warusha, Yalu Malu Yalu 2).
Tom Shannon, 82, American disk jockey (WKBW, CKLW), pancreatic cancer.
Patrick Sky, 80, American singer-songwriter.
Llew Smith, 77, Welsh politician, MEP (1984–1994) and MP (1992–2005), cancer.
Paul Soles, 90, Canadian actor (Spider-Man, Rudolph the Red-Nosed Reindeer, Redwall).
Sze-Piao Yang, 100, Taiwanese pulmonologist.
Red Top Young, 85, American musician.

27
Shane Briant, 74, British actor (Demons of the Mind, Frankenstein and the Monster from Hell, Captain Kronos – Vampire Hunter).
Violetta Elvin, 97, Russian prima ballerina and actress.
Carla Fracci, 84, Italian ballet dancer and actress, cancer.
Foster Friess, 81, American investment manager.
Karl-Heinz Heddergott, 94, German football manager (FC Köln, Egypt national team, Oman national team).
Robert Hogan, 87, American actor (The Lady in Red, Species II, Youth in Oregon), complications from pneumonia.
Kees de Jager, 100, Dutch astronomer.
Lorina Kamburova, 30, Bulgarian actress (Nightworld, Leatherface, Doom: Annihilation) and singer, pneumonia.
Shantiraj Khosla, 54, Indian composer, COVID-19.
Jaime Lerner, 83, Brazilian architect, urban planner and politician, governor of Paraná (1995–2002), mayor of Curitiba (1971–1974, 1979–1983, 1989–1992), kidney disease.
Mohan Raj Malla, Nepalese politician, governor of Sudurpashchim Province (2019), COVID-19.
Peter Millett, Baron Millett, 88, British jurist and life peer, Lord of Appeal in Ordinary (1998–2004) and non-permanent judge of the Hong Kong Court of Final Appeal (since 2000).
María Teresa Miras Portugal, 73, Spanish biochemist, cancer.
Vladilen Nikitin, 84, Russian politician, Soviet minister of agriculture (1985) and first deputy chairman of the Council of Ministers (1989–1990). (death announced on this date)
František Reich, 91, Slovak Olympic rower (1952, 1956).
Patricio Rojas, 88, Chilean physician, surgeon and politician, minister of the interior (1969–1970) and national defence (1990–1994).
Nicos A. Rolandis, 86, Cypriot politician, minister of foreign affairs (1978–1983) and deputy (1991–1996).
Nelson Sargento, 96, Brazilian samba musician (Estação Primeira de Mangueira), COVID-19.
Poul Schlüter, 92, Danish politician, prime minister (1982–1993), minister of justice (1989), and MEP (1994–1999).
Jay Sydeman, 93, American composer.
John Roper-Curzon, 20th Baron Teynham, 92, British peer, member of the House of Lords (1972–1999).
Zdenko Vukasović, 79, Croatian footballer (Anderlecht, Cercle Brugge, Lokeren).
Steef Weijers, 91, Dutch politician, member of the Second Chamber (1970–1972, 1975–1989).
Norman Weissman, 96, American documentary writer, director and producer.
K. C. Yadav, 84, Indian historian, heart attack.

28
Zohra Abdullayeva, 68, Azerbaijani musician.
Resurreccion Acop, 73, Filipino doctor and politician, representative (since 2019), COVID-19.
Zablon Amanaka, 45, Kenyan footballer (Željezničar Sarajevo, Mahakama, national team).
Jim Beirne, 74, American football player (Houston Oilers, San Diego Chargers).
Jimi Bellmartin, 71, Dutch singer.
Esther Brown, 67, British pensioner, beaten.
William F. Clinger Jr., 92, American politician, member of the U.S. House of Representatives (1979–1997) and chair of the House Oversight Committee (1995–1997).
Mark Eaton, 64, American basketball player (Utah Jazz), bicycle crash.
Markus Egen, 93, German Olympic ice hockey player (1952, 1956, 1960).
Fujie Eguchi, 88, Japanese table tennis player, pancreatic cancer.
Henrik Enderlein, 46, German economist and political scientist, complications from melanoma.
He Zhaowu, 99, Chinese historian, translator, and professor at Tsinghua University.
Viktor Hvozd, 61, Ukrainian intelligence officer, drowned.
Paul Johnsgard, 89, American ornithologist.
T. M. Kaliannan, 100, Indian politician, MP (1950–1952) and Tamil Nadu MLA (1952–1967).
Rina Katselli, 83, Cypriot playwright and politician, member of the House of Representatives (1981–1996).
Mumtaz Ahmed Khan, 85, Indian humanitarian.
Albert Kookesh, 72, American politician, member of the Alaska House of Representatives (1997–2005) and Senate (2005–2013).
Joseph Nunzio Latino, 83, American Roman Catholic prelate, bishop of Jackson (2003–2013).
Tony Marino, 90, American professional wrestler (WWWF, NWA).
Archie Matsos, 86, American football player (Buffalo Bills, Oakland Raiders, Denver Broncos).
Ken McElligott, 81, Australian politician, Queensland MLA (1983–1998).
Barbara Ossenkopp, 78, German actress (Seduction: The Cruel Woman, Dem Täter auf der Spur, Mozart und Meisel).
Pragmulji III, 85, Indian royal, maharao of Kutch (since 1991), complications of COVID-19.
Henryk Samsonowicz, 91, Polish historian, minister of education (1988–1991).
Benoît Sokal, 66, Belgian comics artist (Inspector Canardo) and video game developer (Syberia, Sinking Island).
Christopher Taylor, 85, British landscape archaeologist.
Emma Shannon Walser, 91, Liberian lawyer and jurist.
Zhang Kaiyuan, 94, Chinese historian, president of CCNU (1984–1990).

29
Munirathna Anandakrishnan, 92, Indian civil engineer, vice-chancellor of Anna University (1990–1996), COVID-19.
Francis J. Bradley, 85, American health physicist.
Maurice Capovilla, 85, Brazilian film director (The Prophet of Hunger, The Night of the Scarecrow, O Jogo da Vida) and screenwriter.
Judith Godwin, 91, American painter.
John Gregg, 82, Australian actor (Armchair Thriller, Bodyline, Heatwave).
Marcell Jankovics, 79, Hungarian animator and film director (Johnny Corncob, Sisyphus, The Struggle).
Dani Karavan, 90, Israeli sculptor (Monument to the Negev Brigade).
Johan von Koskull, 56, Finnish Olympic sailor (1984, 1988).
Forrest Lothrop, 96, American college football coach (Dickinson State).
Gavin MacLeod, 90, American actor (The Love Boat, The Mary Tyler Moore Show, McHale's Navy).
Ian Marsh, 65, Australian footballer (Essendon), cancer.
Thomas Mathiesen, 87, Norwegian sociologist.
Paolo Maurensig, 78, Italian novelist.
Charles F. McDevitt, 89, American judge and politician, member of the Idaho House of Representatives (1962–1966).
Keith Mullings, 53, Jamaican boxer, WBC super welterweight champion (1997–1999).
Abner Oakes, 87, Canadian-born American ice hockey player (Dartmouth) and coach.
Kenzo Oshima, 78, Japanese diplomat, United Nations under-secretary-general for humanitarian affairs and emergency relief coordinator (2001–2003), heart attack.
Ljubica Ostojić, 76, Bosnian poet and playwright.
Hossam Al-Sabah, 73, Lebanese actor, traffic collision.
Leonid Ivanovich Shcherbakov, 84, Russian military officer.
Cornelius Sim, 69, Bruneian Roman Catholic cardinal, apostolic vicar of Brunei Darussalam (since 2005), cardiac arrest.
Venkat Subha, Indian actor (Kattappava Kanom, Kazhugu 2, Gorilla), COVID-19.
B. J. Thomas, 78, American singer ("Raindrops Keep Fallin' on My Head", "Another Somebody Done Somebody Wrong Song", "Hooked on a Feeling"), five-time Grammy winner, lung cancer.
Johnny Trudell, 82, American composer and jazz trumpeter.
Notable Americans who died in the 2021 Percy Priest Lake Cessna Citation crash:
Joe Lara, 58, American actor (American Cyborg: Steel Warrior, Steel Frontier, Tarzan: The Epic Adventures).
Gwen Shamblin Lara, 66, writer and dietician (Christian diet programs).

30
Chester Apy, 89, American politician, member of the New Jersey General Assembly (1968–1970, 1972–1974).
Tonnie van As, 93, Dutch footballer (SBV Vitesse).
Mikhail Beregovoy, 103, Russian military officer.
Andriy Beshta, 44, Ukrainian politician and diplomat, ambassador to Thailand (since 2015), heart attack.
John Carpenter, 84, Irish football referee.
Ralph Davis, 82, American basketball player (Cincinnati Royals, Chicago Packers).
Jason Dupasquier, 19, Swiss motorcycle road racer, competition crash.
Harussani Zakaria, 82, Malaysian Islamic scholar and Perak mufti, COVID-19.
Asei Kobayashi, 88, Japanese composer (Wolf Boy Ken, The King Kong Show, Tekkaman: The Space Knight), heart failure.
Muriel Kovitz, 95, Canadian academic.
Claude Landini, 95, Swiss Olympic basketball player (1948).
Neville Meaney, 88, Australian historian.
Rick Mitchell, 66, Australian sprinter, Olympic silver medalist (1980), prostate cancer.
Frank Navarro, 91, American college football player (Maryland Terrapins) and coach (Williams Ephs, Princeton Tigers).
Parminder Singh Saini, 63, Kenyan Olympic field hockey player (1984, 1988).
Baddegama Samitha Thero, 68, Sri Lankan monk and politician, MP (1997–2004), COVID-19.
Mythili Sivaraman, 81, Indian women's rights activist, COVID-19.
Ingo Sick, 82, Swiss experimental nuclear physicist, stomach cancer.
P. W. T. Simanjuntak, 85, Indonesian Lutheran priest, MP (1967–1971).
Choudhary Khush Akhtar Subhani, Pakistani politician, Punjab MPA (since 2018).
George Tintor, 64, Canadian Olympic rower (1976).
Håvard Tveite, 59, Norwegian orienteer.

31
Colin Appleton, 85, English football player (Leicester City, Charlton Athletic) and manager (Swansea City).
Hugo Bakker, 35, Dutch organist and music educator.
Dave Barsley, 81, Australian rugby league player (Western Suburbs, Newtown).
Andreea Bollengier, 46, Romanian-born French chess player, Woman International Master (2000).
Romain Bouteille, 84, French playwright and actor.
James Crawford, 72, Australian jurist, judge of the International Court of Justice (since 2015).
Peter Del Monte, 77, Italian film director (Traveling Companion, Etoile, Piccoli fuochi) and screenwriter.
Arlene Golonka, 85, American actress (Mayberry R.F.D., The In-Laws, Hang 'Em High).
Albert Krivchenko, 85, Russian politician and journalist, governor of Amur Oblast (1991–1993).
Lil Loaded, 20, American rapper and internet personality, suicide.
Robert Low, 68–69, Scottish author (The Whale Road, The Wolf Sea, The Lion Wakes) and journalist.
Mike Marshall, 78, American baseball player (Los Angeles Dodgers, Montreal Expos, Minnesota Twins), complications from Alzheimer's disease.
Sérgio Mascarenhas de Oliveira, 93, Brazilian physicist and educator.
Istvan Raskovy, 84, Australian Olympic Greco-Roman wrestler (1964).
Laxmikant Sharma, 60, Indian politician, Madhya Pradesh minister for education, leader of Bharatiya Janata Party, COVID-19.
Devendra Pratap Singh, 55, Indian politician, Uttar Pradesh MLC (2010–2016).
Hemendra Singh Banera, 75, Indian politician, MP (1971–1977, 1989–1991), COVID-19.

References

2021-05
05